The "Indian languages TRANSliteration" (ITRANS) is an ASCII transliteration scheme for Indic scripts, particularly for the Devanagari script.

The need for a simple encoding scheme that used only keys available on an ordinary keyboard was felt in the early days of the RMIM newsgroup where lyrics and trivia about Indian popular movie songs were being discussed. In parallel was a Sanskrit Mailing list that quickly felt the need of an exact and unambiguous encoding. ITRANS emerged on the RMIM newsgroup as early as 1994. This was spearheaded by Avinash Chopde, who developed a transliteration package. Its latest version is v5.34. The package also enables automatic conversion of the Roman script to the Indic version.

ITRANS was in use for the encoding of Indian etexts - it is wider in scope than the Harvard-Kyoto scheme for Devanagari transliteration, with which it coincides largely, but not entirely. The early Sanskrit mailing list of the early 1990s, almost same time as RMIM, developed into the full blown Sanskrit Documents project and now uses ITRANS extensively, with thousands of encoded texts. With the wider implementation of Unicode, the traditional IAST is used increasingly also for electronic texts.

Like the Harvard-Kyoto scheme, the ITRANS romanization only uses diacritical signs found on the common English-language computer keyboard, and it is quite easy to read and pick up.

ITRANS transliteration scheme

ITRANS transliteration scheme is given in the tables below. The ITRANS method is without using diacritics, as compared to other transliteration methods. While using ITRANS, for proper nouns, first letter capitalization is not possible since, ITRANS uses both capital and small letters in its lettering scheme.

Vowels

Consonants
The Devanāgarī consonant letters include an implicit 'a' sound. In all of the transliteration systems, that 'a' sound must be represented explicitly.

Standard Indic consonants

Irregular consonant clusters

Prenasalized consonants

Consonants with Nuqta

Dravidian consonants

Examples 
  – 
  – 
  – 
  – 
  – 
  – 
  –

Limitations 

Since ITRANS was primarily designed for Sanskrit (and other modern Indo-Aryan languages), it lacks full-coverage for Indic scripts of other languages. Specifically, the support for Dravidian short-vowels 'e' and 'o' is considered ambiguous (since Indo-Aryan phonology does not differentiate them from long-vowels 'E' and 'O'). Also, the schwa used in languages like Bengali ([ɔ]) and Assamese ([ɒ]) differs from that of other languages ([ə]), causing a dissonant feeling when typing those languages. Moreover, although both Bengali and Assamese use Eastern Nagari, the phonology of Assamese varies from that of Bengali to a significant extent, causing more friction while typing Assamese.

The support for many phones of other languages like Dravidian, Hindustani nuqtas, Sinhala etc. is considered patchy and not consistent across implementations due to lack of standardization. Also, almost no ITRANS implementation fully supports languages like Kashmiri, Sindhi, etc.

New version 

The ambiguity around Dravidian short-vowels 'e' and 'o' support has been addressed with a new ISO15919 compliant coding scheme, which is uniform across all supported languages/scripts, including nukta. The old version ITRANS 5.3 is maintained for backward compatibility.

The changed ones are listed below:

						
The newly launched revamped package supports both the old ITRANS V-5.3 scheme as well as the ISO15919 scheme.

In addition, the new package can be customized for any specific INPUT codes.

https://www.aczoom.com/itrans/online/

See also 
Devanagari transliteration
Velthuis
IAST
Harvard-Kyoto
National Library at Kolkata romanisation

Notes

References

External links 

 ITRANS Official site
 ITRANS Unicode Tables (PDF)
 HiTrans - Online ITRANS to Unicode converter with scheme extensions
 Online Interface to ITRANS- ITRANS to Unicode UTF8 (Converter tool from Latin script using ITRANS to various Indic scripts)
 View Unicode Hindi through Roman transliteration (ITRNS scheme)
 Google Transliteration (supports Indic Languages) Online and downloadable tool for transliteration by Google. (Also additionally uses ITRANS but older version 1)
 Itranslator 2003 as a freeware from Omkarananda Ashram Himalayas
 Lipika IME available for Mac OS X

Indic computing
Hindustani orthography
Romanization of Brahmic
Sanskrit transliteration